On 26 May 2019 Denmark elected 14 members of the European Parliament. Of these, the 14th member is due to join the parliament when United Kingdom leaves the European Union. Linea Søgaard-Lidell was the 14th member. The 14 members elected were:

‡Karsten Hønge later chose not to take his seat, which was later taken by Kira Marie Peter-Hansen (Socialistisk Folkeparti) with 15,765 personal votes.
Marianne Vind replaced Jeppe Kofod, who received 188,757 personal votes.

Members who joined later 

 Linea Søgaard-Lidell (2020)
 Bergur Løkke Rasmussen (2022)
 Erik Poulsen (2022)
 Anders Vistisen (2022)

References